Black roses do not naturally exist but are symbols with different meanings or for various things.

Flowers
The flowers commonly called black roses do not really exist in said color, instead they actually have a dark shade, such as the "Black Magic", "Barkarole", "Black Beauty" and "Baccara" varieties. They can be artificially colored as well. 

In the language of flowers, roses have many different meanings. Black roses symbolize ideas such as hatred, despair, death or rebirths.

Anarchism

Black Rose Books is the name of the Montreal anarchist publisher and small press imprint headed by the libertarian-municipalist and anarchist Dimitrios Roussopoulos. One of the two anarchist bookshops in Sydney is Black Rose Books which has existed in various guises since 1982.

The Black Rose was the title of a respected journal of anarchist ideas published in the Boston area during the 1970s, as well as the name of an anarchist lecture series addressed by notable anarchist and libertarian socialists (including Murray Bookchin and Noam Chomsky) into the 1990s.

Black Rose Labour (organisation) is the name of a factional political organisation associated with the United Kingdom Labour Party, which defines itself as Libertarian Socialist.

Black Rose Anarchist Federation is a political organization that was founded in 2014, with a few local and regional groups in the United States.

Pop culture
The symbolism in many works of art or fiction is usually to contrive feelings of mystery, danger, death, or some sort of darker emotion like sorrow or obsessive love. The transcendent allure of the mystic black rose continues in today’s pop culture. From literature, television, film and music to anime and even video games. Black roses have also found their place in the fashion world, exuding sophistication. Timeless as the quintessential little black dress or crisp black suit, black roses emanate simple elegance. Incorporate black roses into hair pieces, boutonnieres or corsages for polished perfection.

Examples 
In the Night World series, the black rose is the symbol for made vampires, as opposed to the black iris for lamia (or born vampires).

In the Dragonlance series, the black rose is the symbol for knights who have betrayed their ideals. The most famous is known as Lord Soth, Knight of the Black Rose.

In Revenge (Season 2, Episode 18), black roses are a symbol for dying love.

"Black Rose" is the title of the background music for a level in Eternal Darkness: Sanity's Requiem. "Black Rose" is likely the name of the game's haunted mansion.

In the Babylon 5 episode "Passing Through Gethsemane", a black rose is given to a monk as a symbol of death, and later placed in the mouth of a murdered woman.

In American Horror Story: Murder House Tate gifts Velma a black rose stating that she doesn't like black roses.

 Black Rose  was a hit single by rock band Thin Lizzy and was the title of an album. Lead singer and bass player Phil Lynott had an interest in Irish mythology and claims he was inspired by it.

The artist Charli XCX composed a song entitled "Black Roses", which was included on her 2013 album, True Romance.

The Black Rose is a gift item in the video game Fable. Although most NPCs become offended if a black rose is given to them, they are needed to marry Lady Grey, a seductive villainous noblewoman.

The Black Rose is a secret organization that has existed in the world of League of Legends (known as Runeterra) for thousands of years.

In the first-person team based shooter Team Fortress 2, there exists a knife weapon for the Spy class that takes the namesake of the black rose, which was created in a cross promotion with the game, Alliance of Valiant Arms.

References

 Wilkins, Eithne. The rose-garden game; a tradition of beads and flowers, [New York] Herder and Herder, 1969.

Symbolism
Rose
Language of flowers
Anarchist symbols